Vastagh is a surname. Notable people with the surname include:

György Vastagh (1834–1922), Hungarian painter
Pál Vastagh (born 1946), Hungarian politician and jurist

See also
Vastag

Hungarian-language surnames